The women's singles table tennis event was part of the table tennis programme and took place between December 2 and 7, at the Al-Arabi Indoor Hall.

Schedule
All times are Arabia Standard Time (UTC+03:00)

Results

Finals

Top half

Section 1

Section 2

Section 3

Section 4

Bottom half

Section 5

Section 6

Section 7

Section 8

References

 Results
 Official website

Table tennis at the 2006 Asian Games